In enzymology, an imidazoleacetate—phosphoribosyldiphosphate ligase is an enzyme that catalyzes a chemical reaction

ATP + imidazole-4-acetate + 5-phosphoribosyl diphosphate  ADP + phosphate + 1-(5-phosphoribosyl)imidazole-4-acetate + diphosphate

The 3 substrates of this enzyme are ATP, imidazole-4-acetate, and 5-phosphoribosyl diphosphate, whereas its 4 products are ADP, phosphate, 1-(5-phosphoribosyl)imidazole-4-acetate, and diphosphate.

This enzyme belongs to the family of ligases, specifically those forming generic carbon-nitrogen bonds.  The systematic name of this enzyme class is imidazoleacetate:5-phosphoribosyl-diphosphate ligase (ADP- and diphosphate-forming). This enzyme is also called 5-phosphoribosylimidazoleacetate synthetase.  This enzyme participates in histidine metabolism.

References 

 

EC 6.3.4
Enzymes of unknown structure